The Malawi Government Gazette is the government gazette of Malawi.

The Gazette has been published since independence from Britain in July 1964. Copies up to 1988 may be found in the collections of the British Library.

References

Government gazettes
Publications established in 1964
Law of Malawi
Government of Malawi
Newspapers published in Malawi